Jordan Sarrou (born 9 December 1992) is a French mountain biking competitor, who currently rides for UCI Mountain Bike team Absolute–Absalon–BMC. He won the UCI Mountain Bike World Championships at Leogang, Austria in 2020. He has also competed in road cycling infrequently, finishing third in the 2014 Ruota d'Oro.

Major results

2009
 1st  Cross-country, National Junior Championships
2012
 1st  Cross-country, National Under-23 Championships
 2nd  Team relay, UCI World Championships
2013
 1st  Cross-country, UEC European Under-23 Championships
 2nd  Team relay, UCI World Championships
 3rd Cross-country, National Under-23 Championships
2014
 UCI World Championships
1st  Team relay
2nd  Under-23 Cross-country
 UEC European Championships
1st  Under-23 Cross-country
1st  Team relay
 1st  Cross-country, National Under-23 Championships
 1st  Overall UCI Under-23 XCO World Cup
1st Pietermaritzburg
1st Albstadt
1st Windham
1st Méribel
2nd Cairns
2nd Nové Město
2nd Mont-Sainte-Anne
 1st Roc d'Azur
 3rd Ruota d'Oro
2015
 1st  Team relay, UCI World Championships
 3rd Cross-country, National Championships
2016
 1st  Team relay, UCI World Championships
 1st Roc d'Azur
 2nd  Team relay, UEC European Championships
2017
 3rd  Team relay, UCI World Championships
 UCI XCO World Cup
3rd Vallnord
2019
 1st Roc d'Azur
 2nd Cross-country, National Championships
 3rd  Team relay, UCI World Championships
 UCI XCO World Cup
3rd Albstadt
2020
 1st  Cross-country, UCI World Championships
 1st   Cross-country, National Championships
 French Cup
2nd Alpe d'Huez
 Swiss Bike Cup
3rd Leukerbad
2021
 1st  Team relay, UCI World Championships
 1st  Overall Cape Epic (with Matthew Beers)
1st Prologue & Stage 2
 French Cup
1st Guéret
2nd Lons-le-Saunier
 2nd Cross-country, National Championships
 UCI XCC World Cup
2nd Les Gets
3rd Nové Město
 UCI XCO World Cup
3rd Les Gets
 Swiss Bike Cup
3rd Basel
2022
 French Cup
1st Le Dévoluy
2nd Le Bessat
 1st Roc d'Azur
 2nd Cross-country, National Championships
 UCI XCC World Cup
2nd Albstadt
 UCI XCO World Cup
3rd Val di Sole

References

External links
 
 Jordan Sarrou at MTBCrossCountry.com
 

1992 births
Living people
French male cyclists
Université Savoie-Mont Blanc alumni
Cyclists at the 2015 European Games
European Games competitors for France
Cyclists at the 2020 Summer Olympics
Olympic cyclists of France
Sportspeople from Saint-Étienne
Cyclists from Auvergne-Rhône-Alpes